Tor yingjiangensis is a species of cyprinid of the genus Tor. It inhabits China's Yunnan province. It is considered "data deficient" on the IUCN Red List.

References

Cyprinidae
Cyprinid fish of Asia
Fish described in 2004
IUCN Red List data deficient species